Man Overboard is the fourth solo album released in 1980 by Bob Welch, former guitarist and singer with rock band Fleetwood Mac.  It was reissued as a 2-for-1 CD (the first half being the songs from The Other One) by Edsel Records in 1998. Although it is not currently in print, it was made available for download on iTunes in 2008.

Track listing
All songs written by Bob Welch except where noted.

 "Man Overboard" (Welch, John Carter) – 4:43 
 "Justine" – 4:09
 "Nightmare" (Welch, Carter) – 3:24 
 "B666" – 5:17
 "Don't Rush the Good Things" (Neil Gammack) – 3:40
 "The Girl Can't Stop" – 3:14
 "Jealous" – 2:32
 "Fate Decides" – 3:02
 "Reason" – 2:43
 "Those Days Are Gone" – 2:50

Personnel

Musicians
 Bob Welch – vocals, guitar
 Alan Bran – bass guitar
 David Adelstein – keyboards, synthesizer
 Alvin Taylor – drums
 Randy Meisner – vocals (tracks 8–9)
 Norton Buffalo – harmonica (track 5)
 Marty Jourard – keyboards (track 1), saxophone (track 6)
 Todd Sharp – guitar (track 3)
 Venetta Fields – vocals (tracks 6, 8)
 Paulette Brown – vocals (tracks 6, 8)
 Don Francisco – vocals (tracks 1–2, 6–10)
 Bunny Hill – vocals (track 8)
 Wendy Waldman – vocals (tracks 8–9)

Technical
 John Carter – producer
 David Cole – engineer
 Richard McKernan – assistant engineer
 Henry Marquez, Roy Kohara – artwork

References

1980 albums
Bob Welch (musician) albums
Capitol Records albums
Albums recorded at Capitol Studios